Martin Hašek (born 11 October 1969 in Pardubice) is a former Czech football midfielder and current football coach.

Football career
During his extensive playing career, Hašek played professionally for SKP Union Cheb, FC Slovan Liberec, Sparta Prague, FK Austria Wien, SK Sturm Graz, FC Dynamo Moscow, 1. FK Příbram and FC Přední Kopanina, retiring at almost 38. In 1997, in his first spell at Sparta, he teamed up with namesake Ivan, his cousin.

Hašek gained 14 caps for the Czech Republic. Immediately after retiring, he took up coaching, first as an assistant to Sparta. After a brief head spell with lowly FK Baník Sokolov, he returned to his main club in the same capacity, now under legendary Jozef Chovanec.

Personal
Hašek's older brother, Dominik, had an extensive and successful ice hockey career in the NHL, as a goaltender.

Player Honours

Club
Sparta Prague
 Czech First League: 1997–1998, 1998–1999, 1999–2000, 2000–2001, 2004–2005
 Czech Cup: 2006

Austria Wien
 Austrian Bundesliga: 2002–2003

Individual
 Czech First League: Team of the Year 1998–1999

Managerial Honours
Czech Second League Manager of the Month: October 2016

References

External links

Přední Kopanina profile 

1969 births
Living people
Sportspeople from Pardubice
Czech footballers
Czech First League players
Czech expatriate footballers
Association football midfielders
FK Hvězda Cheb players
FC Slovan Liberec players
AC Sparta Prague players
Austrian Football Bundesliga players
FK Austria Wien players
SK Sturm Graz players
Russian Premier League players
FC Dynamo Moscow players
Czech Republic international footballers
FK Baník Sokolov managers
AC Sparta Prague managers
Czech football managers
Expatriate footballers in Russia
Bohemians 1905 managers
Expatriate footballers in Austria
FC Sellier & Bellot Vlašim managers
1. FK Příbram players
FK Ústí nad Labem managers
Czech National Football League managers
FK Pardubice managers